Nature 10 is an annual listicle of ten "people who mattered" in science, produced by the scientific journal Nature. Nominees have made a significant impact in science either for good or for bad. Reporters and editorial staff at Nature judge nominees to have had "a significant impact on the world, or their position in the world may have had an important impact on science". Short biographical profiles describe the people behind some of the year's most important discoveries and events. Alongside the ten, five "ones to watch" for the following year are also listed.

2022 
2022 awardees included:

 Jane Rigby: Sky hunter
 Yunlong Cao: COVID predictor
 Saleemul Huq: Climate revolutionary
 Svitlana Krakovska: Voice for Ukraine
 Dimie Ogoina: Monkeypox watchman
 Lisa McCorkell: Long-COVID advocate
 Diana Greene Foster: Abortion fact-finder
 António Guterres: Crisis diplomat
 Muhammad Mohiuddin: Transplant trailblazer
 Alondra Nelson: Policy principal

Ones to watch in 2023:

 Sherry Rehman, Minister of climate change, Pakistan
 Nallathamby Kalaiselvi, Indian Council of Scientific and Industrial Research
 Sun Chunlan, Chinese Communist Party
 Renee Wegrzyn, US Advanced Research Projects Agency for Health
 Anthony Tyson, University of California, Davis

2021 

2021 awardees included:
 Winnie Byanyima vaccine warrior
 Friederike Otto, weather detective
 Zhang Rongqiao, Mars explorer
 Timnit Gebru, AI ethics leader
 Tulio de Oliveira, variant tracker
 John Jumper, protein predictor
 Victoria Tauli-Corpuz, indigenous defender
 Guillaume Cabanac, deception sleuth
 Meaghan Kall, COVID communicator
 Janet Woodcock, drug chief 

Ones to watch in 2022:
 Chikwe Ihekweazu, epidemiologist at the WHO Hub for Pandemic and Epidemic Intelligence
 Jane Rigby, astrophysicist at the NASA Goddard Space Flight Center
 Love Dalén, geneticist at the Swedish Museum of Natural History
 Xie Zhenhua, China's special envoy on climate change
 Graziano Venanzoni, physicist at the Italian National Institute for Nuclear Physics

2020 

2020 awardees included:

 Tedros Ghebreyesus, Warning the world
 Verena Mohaupt, Polar patroller
 Gonzalo Moratorio, Coronavirus hunter
 Adi Utarini, Mosquito commander
 Kathrin Jansen, Vaccine leader
 Zhang Yongzhen, Genome sharer
 Chanda Prescod-Weinstein, A force in physics
 Li Lanjuan, Lockdown architect
 Jacinda Ardern, Crisis leader
 Anthony Fauci, Science’s defender

Ones to watch in 2021:

 Marion Koopmans, Erasmus University Medical Center, Rotterdam, the Netherlands
 Zhang Rongqiao, China National Space Administration
 Karen Miga, University of California, Santa Cruz
 Rochelle Walensky, Harvard Medical School, Boston, Massachusetts
 Jane Greaves, Cardiff University, UK

2019 

2019 awardees included:

Ricardo Galvão: Science defender
Victoria Kaspi: Sky sleuth
Nenad Sestan: Britain recove rebooter 
Sandra Díaz: Biodiversity guardian
Jean-Jacques Muyembe-Tamfum: Ebola fighter
Yohannes Haile-Selassie: Origin seeker
Wendy Rogers: Transplant ethicist
Deng Hongkui: CRISPR translator
John M. Martinis: Quantum builder 
Greta Thunberg: Climate catalyst

Ones to watch in 2020:

António Guterres: Secretary-general, United Nations
Denis Rebrikov: Kulakov National Medical Research Center for Obstetrics, Gynecology and Perinatology, Moscow
Geng Meiyu: Shanghai Institute of Materia Medica, China
Mariya Gabriel: European Commissioner for Innovation, Research, Culture, Education and Youth
Markus Rex: Alfred Wegener Institute, Germany

2018

2018 awardees included:

 Yuan Cao: Graphene wrangler
 Viviane Slon: Humanity's historian 
 He Jiankui: CRISPR rogue
 Jess Wade: Diversity champion 
 Valérie Masson-Delmotte: Earth monitor 
 Anthony Brown: Star mapper 
 Yeo Bee Yin: Force for the environment 
 Barbara Rae-Venter: DNA detective
 Robert-Jan Smits: Open-access leader
 Makoto Yoshikawa: Asteroid hunter

Ones to watch in 2019:

Jean-Jacques Muyembe-Tamfum, Director-general of the Democratic Republic of the Congo National Institute for Biomedical Research
Julia Olson, Co-counsel in Juliana v. United States
Muthayya Vanitha, Director of India's Chandrayaan-2 Moon mission
Maura McLaughlin, Chair at the  North American Nanohertz Observatory for Gravitational Waves
Sandra Díaz, Co-leader of the Intergovernmental Science-Policy Platform on Biodiversity and Ecosystem Services (IPBES) Global Assessment of Biodiversity and Ecosystem Services

2017

2017 awardees included:

 David R. Liu: Gene corrector
 Marica Branchesi: Merger maker 
 Emily Whitehead: Living testimonial
 Scott Pruitt: Agency dismantler
 Pan Jianwei: Father of quantum
 Jennifer Byrne: Error sleuth
 Lassina Zerbo: Test-ban tracker
 Victor Cruz-Atienza: Quake chaser
 Ann Olivarius: Legal champion
 Khaled Toukan: Opening SESAME

Ones to watch in 2018:

 Shaughnessy Naughton, President of 314 Action
 Mark Walport, Chief executive of United Kingdom Research and Innovation (UKRI)
 Kate Crawford, Co-founder of AI Now Institute
 John M. Martinis, Team leader of Quantum computing at Google
 Patricia Espinosa, Executive secretary of the United Nations Framework Convention on Climate Change (UNFCC)

2016

2016 awardees included:
 Gabriela Gonzalez: Gravity spy 
 Demis Hassabis: Mind crafter 
 Terry Hughes: Reef sentinel
 Guus Velders: Cooling agent 
Celina M. Turchi: Zika detective
 Alexandra Elbakyan: Paper pirate 
 John J. Zhang: Fertility rebel 
 Kevin Esvelt: CRISPR cautionary 
 Guillem Anglada-Escudé: Planet hunter
 Elena Long: Diversity trailblazer 

Ones to watch in 2017:
 Cori Bargmann, Science president, Chan Zuckerberg Initiative
 Robert Feidenhans’l, Chairman, European XFEL
 Jef Boeke, Co-leader, Human Genome Project–Write
 Wu Weiren, Chief Designer, China Lunar Programme
 Marcia McNutt, President, National Academy of Sciences

2015

2015 awardees included:
 Christiana Figueres: Climate guardian 
 Junjiu Huang: Embryo editor 
 Alan Stern: Pluto hunter 
 Zhenan Bao: Master of materials 
 Ali Akbar Salehi: Nuclear diplomat 
Joan Schmelz: A voice for women
David Reich: Genome archaeologist
 Mikhail Eremets: Super conductor 
Christina Smolke: Fermenting revolution 
 Brian Nosek: Bias blaster 

Ones to watch in 2016:

 Fabiola Gianotti, Director-general of CERN
 Gabriela González, Spokesperson at Advanced LIGO
 Kathy Niakan, Stem-cell biologist, Francis Crick Institute
 Demis Hassabis, Co-founder, DeepMind
 Yang Wei, Head of the National Natural Science Foundation of China

2014

2014 awardees included:

 Andrea Accomazzo: Comet chaser
 Suzanne L. Topalian: Cancer combatant 
 Radhika Nagpal: Robot-maker 
 Sheik Umar Khan: Ebola doctor 
 David Spergel: Cosmic skeptic 
 Maryam Mirzakhani: Surface explorer 
 Pete Frates: Ice-bucket challenger 
 Koppillil Radhakrishnan: Rocket launcher 
 Masayo Takahashi: Stem-cell tester 
 Sjors Scheres: Structure solver 

Ones to watch in 2015:

Xie Zhenhua, China's top climate official
Alan Stern, Principal investigator of NASA's New Horizons mission
Joanne Liu, International president of Médecins Sans Frontières (MSF)
Bernard Bigot, Nominated as next director-general of ITER
Rick Horwitz, Executive director, Allen Institute for Cell Science

2013

2013 awardees included:
 Feng Zhang: DNA's master editor 
 Tania Simoncelli: Gene patent foe 
 Deborah Persaud: Viral victor 
 Michel Mayor: In search of sister Earths 
 Naderev Saño: Climate conscience 
 Viktor Grokhovsky: Meteorite hunter 
 Hualan Chen: Front-line flu sleuth 
 Shoukhrat Mitalipov: The cloning chief 
 Kathryn Clancy: An eye on harassment 
 Henry Snaith: Sun worshipper 

Ones to watch in 2014:

 Masayo Takahashi, RIKEN Center for Developmental Biology
 Christopher Field of the Intergovernmental Panel on Climate Change
 Jean-Pierre Bourguignon Incoming president, European Research Council (ERC)
 Koppillil Radhakrishnan Chairman, Indian Space Research Organisation
 Gordon Sanghera from Oxford Nanopore Technologies

2012

2012 awardees included:
 Rolf-Dieter Heuer: The Higgs diplomat
Cynthia E. Rosenzweig: Guardian of Gotham
Adam Steltzner: Our man on Mars
Cedric Blanpain: Cell tracker
Elizabeth Iorns: Replication hound
Jun Wang: Genome juggernaut
Jo Handelsman: The bias detective
 Tim Gowers: Seed of discontent
Bernardo De Bernardinis: On the fault line
Ron Fouchier: Flu fighter

Ones to watch in 2013:
 Anne Glover, European Commission chief science adviser
 Thomas Stocker, of the Intergovernmental Panel on Climate Change (IPCC)
 Chris Austin, US National Center for Advancing Translational Sciences
 Jan Tauber, the European Space Agency’s Planck mission
 Rafael Yuste, of Columbia University, New York

2011

2011 awardees included:
 Dario Autiero: Relativity challenger
Sara Seager: Planet seeker
Lisa Jackson: Pollution cop
Essam Sharaf: Science revolutionary
Diederik Stapel: Fallen star
Rosie Redfield: Critical enquirer
Danica May Camacho: Child of the times
Mike Lamont: The Higgs mechanic
Tatsuhiko Kodama: Fukushima's gadfly
John Rogers: Tech executive

References

Lists of people in STEM fields
Springer Science+Business Media